Rahzir Smith-Jones (born 1 November 2000) is a Bermudan footballer who currently plays as a midfielder for Welwyn Garden City.

Career statistics

International

References

2000 births
Living people
Bermudian footballers
Bermudian expatriate footballers
Bermuda youth international footballers
Bermuda international footballers
Association football midfielders
Queens Park Rangers F.C. players
Welwyn Garden City F.C. players
Bermudian expatriate sportspeople in England
Expatriate footballers in England
Bermuda under-20 international footballers